The Catholic Church in Ecuador comprises only a Latin hierarchy, united in a national episcopal conference, which comprises:
 four ecclesiastical provinces, each province is headed by the Metropolitanan archbishop of an archdiocese, and a total of 14 suffragan dioceses. 
 are also eight pre-diocesan, missionary Apostolic Vicariates, headed by Titular bishops
 one Military Ordinariate in (and for the armed forces in all) Ecuador.
 
The Metropolitan Archbishopric of Quito is the Primatial see of Ecuador.

There is an Apostolic Nunciature as papal diplomatic representation (embassy level), in national capital Quito.

There are no Eastern Catholic jurisdictions and no titular sees. All defunct jurisdictions have current successor sees.

Current Latin sees 

The boundaries of the 24 administrative provinces of Ecuador mostly coincide with the boundaries of most territorial ecclesiastical jurisdictions.

Exempt jurisdictions 
These are directly dependent on the Holy See.

Military Ordinariate 
 Military Ordinariate of Ecuador, an army bishopric

Apostolic Vicariates 
 Apostolic Vicariate of Aguarico
 Apostolic Vicariate of Esmeraldas
 Apostolic Vicariate of Galápagos
 Apostolic Vicariate of Méndez
 Apostolic Vicariate of Napo
 Apostolic Vicariate of Puyo
 Apostolic Vicariate of San Miguel de Sucumbíos
 Apostolic Vicariate of Zamora en Ecuador

Ecclesiastical province of Quito
 Metropolitan Archdiocese of Quito, primate of Ecuador
Diocese of Ambato
Diocese of Guaranda
Diocese of Ibarra
Diocese of Latacunga
Diocese of Riobamba
Diocese of Tulcán

Ecclesiastical province of Cuenca
 Metropolitan Archdiocese of Cuenca
Diocese of Azogues
Diocese of Loja
Diocese of Machala

Ecclesiastical province of Guayaquil
 Metropolitan Archdiocese of Guayaquil
Diocese of Babahoyo
Diocese of Daule
Diocese of San Jacinto
Diocese of Santa Elena

Ecclesiastical province of Portoviejo
 Metropolitan Archdiocese of Portoviejo
Diocese of Santo Domingo en Ecuador

Demographics
Accoriding to recent statistics, Catholics make up 77% of the population of Ecuador.

See also 
 List of Catholic dioceses (structured view)
 Pan-Amazonian Ecclesial Network (REPAM)

References

Sources and external links 
 GCatholic.org - data for all sections.
 Catholic-Hierarchy entry.
 Official website of the Catholic Church in Ecuador 

 
Ecuador